Apache Qpid is an open-source messaging system which implements the Advanced Message Queuing Protocol (AMQP). It provides transaction management, queuing, distribution, security, management, clustering, federation and heterogeneous multi-platform support. The Apache Qpid API supports multiple programming languages and comes with both C++ (for Perl, Python, Ruby, .NET etc.) and Java (JMS API) brokers.

History
In 2005 JPMorgan Chase approached other firms to form a working group that included Cisco Systems, IONA Technologies, iMatix, Red Hat, and Transaction Workflow Innovation Standards Team (TWIST).  In the same year JPMorgan Chase partnered with Red Hat to create Apache Qpid, initially in Java and soon after C++.

List of components 
Apache Qpid consists of a set of messaging APIs, servers and tools.

See also
 
Message-oriented middleware
Enterprise Messaging System
Enterprise Integration Patterns
Service-oriented architecture
Event-driven SOA

References

External links

Qpid
Message-oriented middleware
Service-oriented architecture-related products
Enterprise application integration